Jorge Lozano and Todd Witsken were the defending champions but did not compete that year.

Mark Kratzmann and Wally Masur won in the final 6–3, 4–6, 7–6 against Pieter Aldrich and Danie Visser.

Seeds
Champion seeds are indicated in bold text while text in italics indicates the round in which those seeds were eliminated.

Draw

Final

Top half

Bottom half

External links
 1989 Volvo International Doubles Draw

Doubles